Daniel Bourke (1886 – 13 April 1952) was an Irish Fianna Fáil politician. A wagon builder before entering politics, he was first elected to Dáil Éireann as a Fianna Fáil Teachta Dála (TD) at the September 1927 general election for the Limerick constituency. He was re-elected at every subsequent general election up to 1951. He died in 1952 during the 14th Dáil, a by-election was held on 26 June 1952 which was won by John Carew of Fine Gael.

He was Mayor of Limerick from 1936 until 1941.

References

1886 births
1952 deaths
Fianna Fáil TDs
Members of the 6th Dáil
Members of the 7th Dáil
Members of the 8th Dáil
Members of the 9th Dáil
Members of the 10th Dáil
Members of the 11th Dáil
Members of the 12th Dáil
Members of the 13th Dáil
Members of the 14th Dáil
Politicians from County Limerick
Mayors of Limerick (city)